Martin is a city in Weakley County, Tennessee, United States.  The population was 11,473 according to the 2010 census. The city is the home of the University of Tennessee at Martin.

History

Martin is named for Captain William Martin.  William Martin was born in Halifax County, Virginia in 1806, and moved to Weakley County, Tennessee with his wife Sarah in 1832.  Captain Martin prospered through tobacco farming and began working to establish a railroad connection in what would later become Martin in 1852.  It was not until after his death in 1859 that his sons, led primarily by George W. Martin, persuaded the Mississippi Central Railroad to locate a connection with the Nashville and Northwestern Railroad in what would become Martin, Tennessee in 1872.

Geography
Martin is located at  (36.341836, -88.851647).

Major roads and highways
 U.S. Route 45E (Elm St., Lindell St.)
 State Route 22
 State Route 431 (Main Street, University Street)
 State Route 43 (Skyhawk Parkway)

Climate

Demographics

2020 census

As of the 2020 United States census, there were 10,825 people, 3,958 households, and 2,049 families residing in the city.

2000 census
At the 2000 census there were 10,515 people, 3,773 households, and 2,029 families living in the city. The population density was 848.9 people per square mile (327.7/km). There were 4,106 housing units at an average density of 331.5 per square mile (128.0/km).  The racial makeup of the city was 66.32% White, 25.62% African American, 0.08% Native American, 4.13% Asian, 0.97% from other races, and 0.89% from two or more races. Hispanic or Latino of any race were 3.82%.

Of the 3,773 households 24.0% had children under the age of 18 living with them, 41.1% were married couples living together, 9.9% had a female householder with no husband present, and 46.2% were non-families. 34.1% of households were one person and 11.5% were one person aged 65 or older. The average household size was 2.20 and the average family size was 2.87.

The age distribution was 16.7% under the age of 18, 32.6% from 18 to 24, 21.4% from 25 to 44, 16.4% from 45 to 64, and 12.9% 65 or older. The median age was 26 years. For every 100 females, there were 89.9 males. For every 100 females age 18 and over, there were 86.0 males.

The median household income was $26,493 and the median family income  was $38,648. Males had a median income of $29,836 versus $22,219 for females. The per capita income for the city was $15,184. About 15.8% of families and 27.1% of the population were below the poverty line, including 27.7% of those under age 18 and 15.7% of those age 65 or over.

ZIP codes
The ZIP codes used in the Martin area are: 38237 and 38238, with the latter reserved for the University of Tennessee at Martin.

Media

Newspapers
 Weakley County Press

Radio
 WCMT-AM 1410 100.5FM 
 WCMT-FM 101.3
 WUTM-FM 90.3
 (WCDZ FM 95.1 and 102.9FM)
 WCMT-AM 1410 "your best friend"

Points of interest
 University of Tennessee at Martin
 University of Tennessee Botanical Gardens
 Westview High School (Tennessee)
 Tennessee Soybean Festival
 C. E. Weldon Public Library

Notable people
 Chad Clifton - NFL player for the Green Bay Packers
 Leonard Hamilton - UTM alumnus, men’s basketball coach, Florida State University
 Justin Harrell - NFL player for the Green Bay Packers
 Lester Hudson - UTM alumnus, NBA player
 Pat Summitt - UTM alumna, Head Coach emerita, UT Knoxville Lady Vols Basketball
 Jerry Reese - UTM alumnus, General Manager, New York Giants (football)
 Hayden White - narrative historian.
 Lin Dunn - UTM alumna, first coach and general manager for the Seattle Storm (basketball)
 Van Jones - UTM alumnus, CNN commentator, Emmy award winner

See also

 List of cities in Tennessee
 Tennessee Soybean Festival

References

External links

 

Cities in Weakley County, Tennessee
Cities in Tennessee